"Cybotron" can refer to:

Cybotron (American band), an American electro band
Cybotron (Australian band), an electronic/experimental group
Cybotron, an album and alter-ego of Dillinja

See also
Cybertron (disambiguation)